Players and pairs who neither have high enough rankings nor receive wild cards may participate in a qualifying tournament held one week before the annual Wimbledon Tennis Championships.

Seeds

  Thomaz Bellucci (first round)
  Go Soeda (first round)
  Tim Smyczek (qualifying competition)
  Gilles Müller (qualified)
  Damir Džumhur (first round)
  Michael Berrer (first round)
  Malek Jaziri (qualifying competition, lucky loser)
  Peter Gojowczyk (first round)
  Denis Kudla (qualified)
  Frank Dancevic (qualifying competition, lucky loser)
  Peter Polansky (second round)
  Andreas Beck (second round)
  Simone Bolelli (qualifying competition, lucky loser)
  Tatsuma Ito (qualified)
  Filip Krajinović (second round)
  Daniel Brands (qualifying competition)
  Norbert Gombos (first round)
  Aljaž Bedene (qualifying competition, lucky loser)
  Pierre-Hugues Herbert (qualified)
  Sam Groth (qualified)
  Ričardas Berankis (qualifying competition)
  Ryan Harrison (qualified)
  Jimmy Wang (qualified)
  Yuichi Sugita (qualified)
  Andrej Martin (first round)
  Alex Kuznetsov (qualified)
  Marsel İlhan (qualified)
  João Souza (first round)
  Marc Gicquel (qualifying competition)
  Farrukh Dustov (second round)
  Rajeev Ram (qualifying competition)
  Guido Andreozzi (first round)

Qualifiers

  Luke Saville
  James Duckworth
  Alex Kuznetsov
  Gilles Müller
  Ante Pavić
  Konstantin Kravchuk
  Marsel İlhan
  Yūichi Sugita
  Denis Kudla
  Jimmy Wang
  Pierre-Hugues Herbert
  Tim Pütz
  Sam Groth
  Tatsuma Ito
  Jan Hernych
  Ryan Harrison

Lucky losers

  Malek Jaziri
  Frank Dancevic
  Simone Bolelli
  Aljaž Bedene

Qualifying draw

First qualifier

Second qualifier

Third qualifier

Fourth qualifier

Fifth qualifier

Sixth qualifier

Seventh qualifier

Eighth qualifier

Ninth qualifier

Tenth qualifier

Eleventh qualifier

Twelfth qualifier

Thirteenth qualifier

Fourteenth qualifier

Fifteenth qualifier

Sixteenth qualifier

External links

 2014 Wimbledon Championships – Men's draws and results at the International Tennis Federation

Men's Singles Qualifying
Wimbledon Championship by year – Men's singles qualifying